An intermission is a break in a play, concert or film, also in sports games.
Intermission can also refer to:

Albums
Intermission (band), a 1993-1996 German Eurodance band
Soul Assassins: Intermission, an album by California hip hop collective Soul Assassins
Intermission (Robert Forster & Grant McLennan album), an album of solo material by members of The Go-Betweens
Intermission (Dio album), an album by the heavy metal band Dio
Intermission (Stratovarius album), an album by the Finnish power metal band Stratovarius
Intermission: the Greatest Hits, a compilation album by Christian rock band dc Talk
Intermission: The Singles Collection, a greatest hits album by Amanda Marshall
Intermission: Extraneous Music from the Residents' Mole Show, an EP by The Residents
Intermission EP, a 2008 release by Canadian hip hop duo Dragon Fli Empire

Songs
"Intermission", a song by British rock band Blur from their 1993 album Modern Life is Rubbish
"Intermission", a song by progressive rock band Tool from their 1996 album Ænima
"Intermission", a song by rock band Panic! At The Disco from their 2005 album A Fever You Can't Sweat Out.
"Intermission", a song by rock band The Offspring from their 1997 album Ixnay on the Hombre
"Intermission", a song by The Cranberries released as a bonus track on To the Faithful Departed
"Intermission", a hidden track by R&B singer R. Kelly from his 1993 album 12 Play
"Intermission", an unreleased song played during intermission in Prince's Lovesexy Tour
"Intermission", a song by the Scottish singer-songwriter Emma Pollock from her 2016 album In Search of Harperfield
"Intermission", a song by Scissor Sisters from the 2006 album Ta-Dah

Film
Intermission (film), a 2003 film set in Dublin, Ireland

See also
Camp Intermission, New York, also known as William Morris House, on the National Register of Historic Places
Intromission (disambiguation)
Intermedio, Italian Renaissance music which was performed between acts of a play
Intermedio (film) ("intermission" in Spanish), a 2005 movie
Entr'acte